Exclusively for My Friends is a series of originally six albums for the MPS label by Canadian jazz pianist Oscar Peterson. The album tracks were recorded live by Hans Georg Brunner-Schwer for MPS on the occasion of private concerts with a small audience in his home studio. The albums have been collected in different box sets over the years.

Recording and release

Recording took place in six separate sessions between 1963 and 1968 in different trio settings as well as with Peterson playing solo. The recordings include performances with his most well-known trio consisting of double bassist Ray Brown and drummer Ed Thigpen and also teams him with bassist Sam Jones and drummers Louis Hayes or Bobby Durham. While around 60 tracks were recorded, only 37 were initially released in five trio albums and one solo album, the first in Peterson's career. The titles on each album were often selected from different recording sessions. Peterson was personally involved in selecting and editing the tapes. Due to contractual reasons, the albums were not released before 1968.

In 1992, the series was re-released as a four CD box set by MPS (and by Verve in the US) which included all recordings of the six original albums. In 1995, the release of the compilation Exclusively for My Friends: The Lost Tapes added twelve previously unreleased tracks to the collection. The constituent albums were also available as individual CDs.

MPS released remastered versions of the original albums as a six LP box set in 2014. One year later, an eight CD box set followed that collected the six albums plus two volumes of Lost Tapes, adding another ten tracks to the overall release group which were personally selected by Hans Georg Brunner-Schwer for release shortly before his death in 2004.

The Penguin Guide to Jazz includes the albums in its "Core Collection".

Original album series
Action  (Vol. 1)
Girl Talk  (Vol. 2)
The Way I Really Play  (Vol. 3)
My Favorite Instrument  (Vol. 4) solo piano
Mellow Mood  (Vol. 5)
Travelin' On  (Vol. 6)

The Lost Tapes
Exclusively for My Friends: The Lost Tapes (1995)

Track listings
For the original track listings see the individual album articles above.

Four CD Box (1992)
CDs 1-3 collect Vol. 1-4 and 6 mostly in the original running order, while CD 4 matches Vol. 4, which contains the solo recordings.

Eight CD Box Set (2015)
Track listings for CDs 1-7 like the original releases (see above).

Personnel
Oscar Peterson - piano
Ray Brown - double bass
Ed Thigpen - drums
Sam Jones - double bass
Louis Hayes - drums
Bobby Durham - drums

References 

1992 compilation albums
Oscar Peterson compilation albums
MPS Records compilation albums